Thiruvakkarai (also spelled as Tiruvakkarai) is a village in the Vanur taluk of Viluppuram district of the Indian state of Tamil Nadu. Situated on the periphery of Auroville global township, it is the home of National Fossil Wood Park and Chandramouleeswar temple.

Demographics
According to the 2011 census, it had a population of 3220. There were 986 women for every 1000 men. The taluk had a literacy rate of 68.73. Child population in the age group below 6 was 11,028 Males and 10,647 Females.

See also
 Auroville
 National Fossil Wood Park
 Chandramouleeswar temple.

References

Archaeological sites in Tamil Nadu
Protected areas of Tamil Nadu
Villages in Viluppuram district